The Men's Boxing Tournament at the 1991 Pan American Games was held in Havana, Cuba from August 2 to August 18. It served as a qualification tournament for the 1992 Summer Olympics. The number one and two earned a ticket for the Barcelona Games. The host country dominated the boxing event, winning all weight divisions except for one: the Light Welterweight (– 63.5 kg). Preliminary bouts were held at the new, multi-purpose Sala Polivalente Kid Chocolate,  finals at Sports City Coliseum.

Qualification 
Shannon Briggs became one of a few boxers to ever qualify for the Games finale, thus gaining the silver medal already, without any competition. His Cuban opponent, Félix Savón, while being regarded much higher by the world amateur rankings, had to fight a semifinal bout.

Medal winners

Medal table

References

External links
Results
Amateur Boxing

P
Events at the 1991 Pan American Games
Boxing at the Pan American Games
International boxing competitions hosted by Cuba